Bosilovo (Opština Bosilovo) is a municipality in the southeast of North Macedonia. The village of Bosilovo is the municipal seat. Bosilovo Municipality is one of the ten municipalities that compose the Southeastern Statistical Region.

Geography
The municipality borders Vasilevo Municipality to the northwest, Berovo Municipality to the northeast, Novo Selo Municipality to the southeast, and Strumica Municipality to the southwest.

Demographics
According to the 2021 census, this municipality has a population of 11,508. Ethnic groups in the municipality include:

Bosilovo Municipality, like neighboring Vasilovo, is notable for its higher concentration of Catholics than is typical for Macedonia which is overall mostly Orthodox and Muslim. In 2002, it was found that there were 959 Catholics, or 7.7% of the municipality's total population. Most of these Catholics are found in the towns of Radovo (where 823 Catholics make up 96.7% of all residents) and Petralinci (where 105 Catholics make up 
17.4% of all residents).

Inhabited places
The municipality comprises 16 villages: Borievo, Bosilovo, Gečerlija, Drvoš, Ednokukjevo, Ilovica, Monospitovo, Petralinci, Radovo, Robovo, Saraj, Sekirnik, Staro Baldovci, Turnovo, Hamzali and Štuka.

References

External links
 Official website

 
Southeastern Statistical Region
Municipalities of North Macedonia